Idrottsföreningen Kamraterna Göteborg, commonly known as IFK Göteborg, is a Swedish professional football club based in Gothenburg. Founded on 4 October 1904, it is the only club in the Nordic countries that has won a pan-European competition, as the club won the UEFA Cup in 1982 and 1987. They have won 18 Swedish championship titles, second most in Swedish football after Malmö FF. IFK is affiliated with Göteborgs Fotbollförbund and play their home games at Gamla Ullevi. IFK Göteborg play in Allsvenskan as of the 2018 season, where they have played for the majority of their history. They have played in the Swedish first tier continuously since 1977, which is the longest ongoing top-flight tenure in Sweden.

IFK Göteborg's first team has competed in a number of nationally contested leagues, and its record against each club faced in these competitions is listed below. The team that IFK Göteborg have met the most times in league competition are AIK against whom IFK have contested 187 league matches. AIK are also the team against whom IFK Göteborg have won the most league matches, 94 in total. Malmö FF are the team against whom IFK have drawn and lost the most league matches, with 40 and 63 respectively. The club against whom IFK Göteborg have scored the most is AIK, who have conceded 342 times against IFK in league competition. AIK are also the most prolific goalscorers against IFK Göteborg in league competition, they have scored 285 times in the clubs' 187 league meetings.

Key
The records include the results of matches played in Göteborgsserien klass 1 (1905 to 1907), Svenska Serien (1910 to 1916–17 and 1920–21 to 1923–24), Fyrkantserien (1918 and 1919), Allsvenskan (1924–25 to 1937–38, 1939–40 to 1949–50, 1951–52 to 1970, and 1977 to present), Division 2 (1938–39, 1950–51, and 1971–1976), and Mästerskapsserien (1991 and 1992).
The records do not include the results of matches played in Göteborgsserien klass 1 play-offs (1906), Allsvenskan qualification play-offs (1938–39 and 2002), or Allsvenskan play-offs (1982 to 1988 and 1990).
To avoid confusion, present-day names of opponents are used throughout. Each club's former names (if any) are given in the list notes.
The season given as the "first" denotes the season in which IFK Göteborg first played a league match against that team.
The season given as the "last" designates the most recent season to have included a league match between IFK Göteborg and that side. Current divisional rivals that the club has never met in the league have a blank entry, indicating that the first league meeting of the season has not yet taken place.

Overall record

Sources:

Notes

Citations

References

External links
IFK Göteborg official website

League record by opponent
Swedish football club statistics
Swedish football club league records by opponent